Royal Air Force Hell's Mouth or more simply RAF Hell's Mouth is a former Royal Air Force Emergency Landing Ground at Hell's Mouth, (Porth Neigwl) on the Llŷn Peninsula near Abersoch, Gwynedd, Wales.

History

RAF Hell's Mouth was commissioned in February 1937 as a Relief Landing Ground, later an Emergency Landing Ground for RAF Penrhos. It took its name from the local coastline which is known as Hell's Mouth due to the 'hellish' conditions for sailors with little shelter from the sea. It was also an air gunnery and bombing range, with targets on the land, floated 1 mile offshore and towed drogues in the air. A small range railway was in use to provide moving targets.

Typical aircraft using the airfield were Bristol Blenheim and Armstrong Whitworth Whitley. In August 1944 a Vickers Wellington was successfully landed by a Polish pilot following an engine failure. Despite the mismatch in size, the aircraft also was able to subsequently take off.

No. 9 (Observers) Advanced Flying Unit RAF was posted here at some point.

Current use
The site was decommissioned in 1945 and returned to agriculture.

See also
 List of former Royal Air Force stations

References

Citations

Bibliography
Annand, David. RAF Penrhos near Pwllheli 1937-45 and RAF Llandwrog near Caernarvon 1940-45. Tywyn : David Annand, 1986.

External links

Images at Geograph

Royal Air Force stations in Wales
Royal Air Force stations of World War II in the United Kingdom